The H.A. Higgins Building, also known as the Flatiron Building, is a historic building in Downtown Columbus, Ohio. It was listed on the National Register of Historic Places in 1979 and Columbus Register of Historic Properties in 1984. The building is architecturally unique in the city, an example of a flatiron building.

See also
 National Register of Historic Places listings in Columbus, Ohio

References

External links
 

Commercial buildings on the National Register of Historic Places in Ohio
Commercial buildings completed in 1914
National Register of Historic Places in Columbus, Ohio
Columbus Register properties
Buildings in downtown Columbus, Ohio
Flatiron buildings